Kattumakkan (English: Wildcat) is a 2016 Indian Malayalam-language feature film directed by Shalil Kallur and starring Mukesh, Vijay Menon and Nassar with Pashanam Shaji, Dharmajan Bolgatty, Satheesh Menon and S. P. Sreekumar. The film introduces Rahul and Eden Kuriakosse as hero and heroine respectively.

This is the second directorial of Shalil Kallur after Dolls, a 2013 release.

Summary

It's the story of Madhavan's life, character played by Mukesh. Madhavan is an ordinary man living in a village with his wife Gauthami and children Neethu and Rahul. An unexpected person came into their happy family life and very soon their happiness and family is destroyed by that person. Madhavan's was not the first family thus destroyed by that unknown person. But Madhavan is the first one who got ready to take his revenge upon that man.

Madhavan had planned that man's murder and he executes it. But he not tried to escape from the punishment. He surrendered to the police. But the unexpected turn of events happens in a way that police investigation shows that Madahavan was innocent and that unknown person had died even before Madhavan had killed him. And there are few more people came out with the claim that they killed that particular person and they also had evidence in their hands to prove that they are the killers. Then the investigation becomes really interesting and that is what forms the plot of this film.

Cast
Rahul Ravi as Rahul
Mukesh as Madhavan
Anju Nair as Gauri
Vijay Menon as Rahul
Nassar
Eden Kuriakose
Niyathi Ashok
Aiswarya Nath
Satheesh Menon
S. P. Sreekumar as Dr. Raveendran
Dharmajan Bolgatty
Pashanam Shaji
Indrans
Sajimon Parayal
Sajan Palluruthy
Moideen Koya
Sadeesh Menon
Faizal
Vishnu Babu
Rastam Ravather
Sachin Raj
Madhusudnan
Narayanan Nair
Majeed Kolliyil
Azees
Noushad Oazeez
Sivadas Mattanoor
Jayan Ashtamichira
Hares
Arjun Melappilly
Siraj
Sumesh
Manoj Madhu
Sadham Hussain
Vishnu Unnikrishnan
Bineesh Bastin
Shabjaan
Renji Varghese
Dileep Guruvayoor
Shakir sathar
Umar Farook 
Ancy Harshal
Seeda Lakshmi
Roshni Singh
Angela
Durga
Riya Mary
Kolapuly Leela
Dhanya

Soundtrack
The film's music was composed by Shine Issai and Murali Guruvayoor to the lyrics of Sajeev Naavakam, Rafeeq Ahammed and Rajeev Alunkal.

References

External links
 

2010s Malayalam-language films
2016 films
Indian thriller films
2016 thriller films